Samir Husni (Arabic: سمير حصني) is a United States–based analyst of the magazine industry. He was born in Tripoli, Lebanon then immigrated to the United States.

He earned a master's degree in journalism from the University of North Texas in 1980 and a Ph.D. in journalism from the University of Missouri in 1983.

Work
Husni has been called a leading expert in magazine publishing.

He manages the Magazine Innovation Center at the University of Mississippi.

He is co-author of the text Managing Today's News Media: Audience First (2015), which suggests news organization management decisions should always begin with consideration of the impact on audience.  Authors Husni, Debora Halpern Wenger and Hank Price introduce "The 4Cs Strategy" to describe how customers, control, choice, and change are all critical factors in managing successful media organizations.

References

External links

American magazine people
University of Missouri alumni
Lebanese emigrants to the United States
Living people
1953 births
People from Oxford, Mississippi
People from Tripoli, Libya
University of North Texas alumni
University of Mississippi faculty